1271 Avenue of the Americas  is a 48-story skyscraper on Sixth Avenue (Avenue of the Americas), between 50th and 51st Streets, in the Midtown Manhattan neighborhood of New York City. Designed by architect Wallace Harrison of Harrison, Abramovitz, and Harris, the building was developed between 1956 and 1960 as part of Rockefeller Center. It was originally known as the Time & Life Building for its main tenant, Time Inc., which also published Life magazine.

1271 Avenue of the Americas contains an eight-story base that partially wraps around the main shaft, as well as a plaza with white-and-gray serpentine pavement and water fountains. The facade consists of glass panels between limestone columns. The lobby contains serpentine floors; white-marble and stainless-steel walls; reddish-burgundy glass ceilings; and artwork by Josef Albers, Fritz Glarner, and Francis Brennan. The ground floor also includes storefronts and originally also housed La Fonda del Sol, a Latin American-themed restaurant. Each of the upper floors measures  and consists of a column-free space around a mechanical core. The 48th floor originally contained the Hemisphere Club, a members-only restaurant during the day.

After Time Inc. expressed its intention to move from 1 Rockefeller Plaza in the 1950s, Rockefeller Center's owners proposed the skyscraper to meet the company's needs while retaining it as a tenant. Construction started in May 1957, the building was topped out during November 1958, and occupants began moving into their offices in late 1959. The New York City Landmarks Preservation Commission designated the Time-Life Building's lobby as a city landmark in 2002. Time Inc. vacated the building in 2015, and the building was subsequently renovated between 2015 and 2019.

Site 

1271 Avenue of the Americas is on the western side of Sixth Avenue (officially Avenue of the Americas), between 50th and 51st Streets, in the Midtown Manhattan neighborhood of New York City. Nearby buildings include The Michelangelo to the west, the Axa Equitable Center to the northwest, 75 Rockefeller Plaza to the northeast, Radio City Music Hall to the east, 30 Rockefeller Plaza to the southeast, and 1251 Avenue of the Americas to the south.

Just prior to the development of 1271 Avenue of the Americas, most of the site was occupied by a parking lot, which had previously served as a New York Railways Company trolley barn. There was also a four-story building facing Sixth Avenue and a collection of single-story shops on 50th Street. Rockefeller Center Inc. bought the plots on 50th and 51st Streets in the first week of August 1953, followed by those on Sixth Avenue the next week. One building on the site reportedly cost $2 million after its owner had held out. Rockefeller Center's managers originally wanted to build an NBC studio or a Ford vehicle showroom on the site.

Architecture 
The building was designed by Harrison & Abramovitz, a firm composed of Wallace Harrison and Max Abramovitz. It was constructed by John Lowry and the George A. Fuller Company. In addition, Syska Hennessy was hired as the mechanical engineer and Edwards & Hjorth was hired as the structural engineer.

The slab is flanked by shorter segments with setbacks at the third and eighth stories. The north and west edges of the tower are flanked by a seven-story section of the base. An auditorium designed by Gio Ponti, with colored triangles, was installed on the eighth-floor setback. The neighboring Roxy Theater was acquired as part of the building's development, allowing the building's floor area to be increased under the limits set by the 1916 Zoning Resolution. Furthermore, a provision under the 1916 Zoning Resolution had allowed structures to rise without setbacks above a given level if all subsequent stories covered no more than 25 percent of the land lot.

Facade 
1271 Avenue of the Americas' facade is made mostly of glass, which at the time of the building's construction cost the same as a wall made mostly of limestone. The use of a glass facade permitted a higher degree of flexibility on each story compared to a limestone wall of the same size. Before the current facade design was selected, several alternatives were considered. Time Inc. wanted a flush exterior wall, but this was rejected because exterior columns would protrude into the floor area. Another alternative entailed an "accordion wall" with windows that sloped inward toward their tops, juxtaposed with spandrels that sloped outward. The accordion wall, which would have been framed by flat columns, was unfeasible because it reduced floor area, required modifications to drapes and air-conditioning, and was not aesthetically desirable to the architects.

At ground level, there is a canopy over the 51st Street entrance. On all stories, the facade includes structural columns with limestone cladding. The limestone columns frame the glass curtain wall and also serve as an architectural allusion to the other buildings at Rockefeller Center. The stainless-steel flashing was meant to last for as long as the building existed; on the setbacks at the base, the flashing was buried inside corners along the roof deck.

There are five vertical bays of windows between each set of limestone columns, each separated by two narrow aluminum mullions flanking the center pane and two larger air-conditioning risers between the outer panes. The spandrels between the windows on different stories consist of a  plate, behind which is a screen made of aluminum mesh. Mechanical pipes and ducts, as well as the floor plates, are hidden behind the spandrels. This also allowed each spandrel to be covered by a standard glass pane. In the late 2010s, new low-emissivity glazed panels with thermal breaks were installed.

Plaza 

The eastern part of the site was planned with a plaza. The plaza is paved with serpentine pavers similar to those found on the sidewalks of Rio de Janeiro's Copacabana Beach, a tribute to its location along Avenue of the Americas. Harrison had believed the pavers would bring variety to the building's design. The original pavers, designed by Port Morris Tile & Marble Corporation, were removed in 2001 because they were too slippery; the same company reproduced the pattern in rougher terrazzo. In the late 2010s, the sidewalk pattern was extended from the lot line to the curb line.

Another six pools, measuring  each, were placed within the plaza. Each pool had a mat made of lead for waterproofing, which in turn was covered by cement and terrazzo. After the late-2010s renovation, the 50th Street pools were removed and a fountain was installed at the corner of 50th Street and Sixth Avenue. Trees and shrubs were originally also planted on the 50th Street side, while three flagpoles were placed on the section of the plaza facing Sixth Avenue.

In 1972, the Association for a Better New York hired William Crovello to create a sculpture called Cubed Curve. The sculpture was supposedly inspired by a fluid brush stroke. According to The New York Times, the sculpture marked Time Inc.'s "presence at the center of the media universe". It was moved in 2018 to Ursinus College in Collegeville, Pennsylvania, because the building was being renovated.

Interior 

The interior design was contracted to a variety of architects such as Alexander Girard, Gio Ponti, Charles Eames, William Tabler, and George Nelson & Company. Thirty elevators serve the building within the mechanical core.

Internally, 1271 Avenue of the Americas was divided into eight zones for air-conditioning. Floors 8, 9, and 16 through 34 were occupied by Time Inc. and contained their own thermostats to accommodate the nonstandard working hours of Time Inc. employees. In conjunction with the building's construction, Rockefeller Center's central air-conditioning system was upgraded in 1957 to provide 6,000 tons of cooling capacity to the building every hour. The cooling systems had to operate all year because Time Inc.'s equipment generated large amounts of heat. The original cooling system was powered by steam, but electric and natural gas cooling systems had been added by 2000. The mechanical spaces are concealed by partial-width windows on the facade.

There are three basement stories. The first basement has a passageway leading to Rockefeller Center's underground concourse and the 47th–50th Streets–Rockefeller Center station. The two other basements are not accessible to the public and are used for storage, maintenance, and service functions.

Ground floor

Lobby 
1271 Avenue of the Americas' lobby is surrounded by commercial spaces on all sides; with the superstructure incorporated in the core and exterior, Harrison could design the lobby with more flexibility. Originally, the lobby was planned to include a covered shopping and exhibit hall on 50th Street and a north–south passage between 50th and 51st Streets. These details were changed significantly in the final plan. The lobby has two entrances to the south on 50th Street, one on either side of the core, as well as an entrance to the north on 51st Street, along the east side of the core. The core itself has two west–east passages connected by elevator banks. The more northerly of the east–west passages has stairs and escalators to the second story and the basement. Until the 1990s, the southern passage had been a narrow hallway because there were two storefronts next to it. A "breezeway" led east to Sixth Avenue, but this had been closed by 2002. Time Inc.'s reception area was within the lobby behind the fountain.

The lobby has the same pavement as the plaza outside the building. This pavement consists of white serpentine terrazzo tiles bordered with stainless steel and aligned from west to east. The pavement, installed by the American Mosaic & Tile Company, was meant to relate with the plaza. The floors had originally been made of cementitious terrazzo. The southern section of the lobby had been expanded in the 1990s, over the site of the storefronts there, but the extended floor did not match the original pavement. The entire lobby was resurfaced in the late 2010s with marble-based terrazzo tiles that matched the original pavement design. Because the marble tiles had contained natural veins of black rock, contractors manually removed the veins before installing the tiles.

The walls are largely made of plate-glass windows and white marble panels. Around the core, the walls are made of stainless steel rectangular panels. The steel panels are designed to complement the floor colors and are arranged in a checkerboard pattern. The ceiling is made of dark maroon glass tiles, finished in a matte covering, with white lighting coves in some tiles. Manufactured by American-Saint Gobain Corporation, the glass tiles are suspended from washers at each corner and are designed to be removed for maintenance. In the late 2010s, the original glass ceiling was replaced with reddish-burgundy tiles that matched the original color.

The lobby walls contain large murals by Josef Albers and Fritz Glarner, both of whom Harrison had known for many years. Glarner's mural, entitled Relational Painting No. 88, measures  and is mounted east of the elevators. It includes overlapping red, yellow, blue, gray, and black geometric shapes on a white background. Albers's mural, entitled Portals, measures  and is mounted west of the elevators. Portals includes alternating bands of white and brown glass, which surround a set of bronze and nickel plates in a way that gives the impression of depth. Relational Painting No. 88 was installed in April 1960, while Portals was installed twelve months later. Another artwork by Fortune art director Francis Brennan was installed north of the elevators in January 1965.

Storefronts 
When 1271 Avenue of the Americas opened, there was a Manufacturers Trust bank branch within the northeast corner of the base, next to the lobby. There had also been two storefronts along the southern end of the lobby, next to the west–east corridor there, but the storefronts were removed in the 1990s.

Along the lobby's west side was La Fonda del Sol (the Inn of the Sun), a Latin American-themed restaurant operated by Joseph Baum of Restaurant Associates. The interiors were designed by Alexander Girard and furniture by Charles Eames. La Fonda had an elaborate entry foyer and a set of dining spaces leading to the largest dining room. The dining rooms were decorated with Latin American artifacts, and each of the dining rooms was furnished in vivid colors with at least two hues of fabrics. It closed in 1971 and was replaced with a bank branch. The branch, originally for the Seaman's Bank for Savings, had round steel columns as well as green marble counters with flecks of white. The businesses in the modern lobby include The Capital Grille and Ted's Montana Grill.

Upper floors

Offices

These were among the largest floor plates of any office building in New York City since World War II. This arrangement was inspired by the PSFS Building in Philadelphia, Pennsylvania. All stairs and elevators are placed in a service core, leaving the outer section of each floor available for use. This improved the efficiency of each floor by allowing an open plan for the offices. The arrangement of the building allowed high flexibility in planning interior offices. An office module in the building generally measured , though these could be combined as necessary.

The firm Designs for Business was responsible for the design of Time Inc.'s space, which originally spanned 21 stories. Time Inc. had to fit multiple small rooms and cubicles on each of its floors, but the company was largely able to fit these rooms and cubicles within the modular system. Square aluminum posts were installed in Time Inc.'s space, through which partition panels could be installed. The panels themselves were made of a myriad of materials including wood, plastic, burlap, and glass, though they were initially not soundproof. Mockups of the offices were manufactured at Astoria, Queens, as well as in Time Inc.'s earlier headquarters at 1 Rockefeller Plaza. The elevator lobbies on each of Time Inc.'s stories had different decorations. The 28th floor also had a photo gallery where photojournalist Alfred Eisenstaedt worked.

After Charles Eames designed the chairs for Time Inc.'s offices, he created a new chair design in 1961, which was nicknamed the Time-Life Chair. Eames designed them as a favor to Henry Luce, who had allowed Eames to use photos from the Time-Life archives for the pavilion he designed at the 1959 American National Exhibition in Moscow. The chairs remain in production , though the original design with four legs at the base has been revised to include a fifth leg for stability and to meet updated product codes. In 2015, one original Time-Life Chair cost $6,000, while the five-legged replicas retailed for $3,000 each.

Other offices in the building originally included the second-story offices of the Gilman Paper Company, designed by SLS-Environetics and connected to the lobby by an escalator. The vestibule at the top of the escalators had stainless-steel wall and a carpet that extended across the floor and part of the walls. Gilman's reception area had an angular reception desk and lighting fixtures made of stainless steel.

Auditorium
Gio Ponti designed an auditorium at the setback above the eighth floor, along with an adjoining kitchen, dining room, reception area, and lounge. This space was meant for meetings with advertisers and corporate and sales functions. The space was arranged with walls at irregular angles and originally had colored glass-block walls and Sicilian paintings. The auditorium itself had a domed ceiling, while the ceiling in the adjoining spaces contained brass motifs. The floors were yellow with green and blue streaks, and geometric wooden furniture was specially designed for the space. The auditorium was closed by 1981, when the furniture was sold; it was redesigned by Davis, Brody & Associates in 1983.

Hemisphere Club and Tower Suite

The Hemisphere Club and Tower Suite shared a space on the 48th floor and was designed by George Nelson & Company. During the day, the Hemisphere Club was a 250-seat private club for executives that, when the building opened, charged $1,000 for initiation and $360 in annual fees thereafter. This made the Hemisphere Club one of several private clubs at the tops of New York City skyscrapers. In the evenings, the restaurant space opened to the public as the Tower Suite, which originally offered meals for $8.50 per person. The restaurant was operated by Restaurant Associates. George Nelson designed special chairs for the restaurant, which apparently were never manufactured. Since the windows split the view from the 48th floor into many sections, the space was designed with window embrasures.

The New Yorker reported several years after the Tower Suite's opening that "a butler in a black tailcoat and a maid in a fluffy white apron" visited every table seven days a week. When the restaurant opened, Craig Claiborne of The New York Times called it "for the most part, excellent"; by 1970, New York magazine called it "the baneful cumulus atop Time Inc." According to New York Times food critic Florence Fabricant, the Tower Suite may have originated the trend of servers introducing themselves to guests. When business at the Hemisphere Club declined with the construction of taller buildings in the area, the space was renovated so it could function as a dining hall at night. Dinners at the Tower Suite cost $11.50 per person in 1970, but they had increased to $70–130 per person by 1990. The Hemisphere Club closed in the 1990s.

History
Time Inc. had been housed at 1 Rockefeller Plaza since 1937, when that building had opened as part of the construction of Rockefeller Center. As early as 1946, it had sought to develop the site of the Marguery Hotel at 270 Park Avenue for a 35-story headquarters designed by Harrison & Abramovitz, though the plans did not come to fruition. By 1953, Time Inc. was set to outgrow its existing space in 1 Rockefeller Plaza within a year, and it wanted to have its headquarters in a single building. Time Inc. seriously considered relocating to Westchester County, a northern suburb of New York City, as well as to a suburb of Philadelphia. By November 1955, the company decided to stay in New York City because of the large number of transportation options there.

Construction

Once Rockefeller Center Inc.'s managers learned of Time Inc.'s predicament, they hired Harrison & Abramovitz to create plans for a building on Rockefeller Center Inc's vacant plot that could house both NBC and Time. The plans involved creating several elevation drawings as well as a 15-minute film. NBC ultimately dropped out of the project because its CEO, David Sarnoff, dissented. Rockefeller Center Inc. acquired the Roxy Theater in August 1956. That December, officials announced the construction of the Time-Life Building. When the plans were announced, Time had leased  in the building, and American Cyanamid, Shell Oil Company, McCann-Erickson, and Esso had already made lease agreements for other floors. The developers had already ordered 27,000 tons of structural steel to be delivered in early 1958.

Time Inc. and Rockefeller Center formed a joint venture, Rock-Time Inc., to share the tower's rent income; Rockefeller Center had the majority stake of 55 percent and Time Inc. had the remaining 45 percent. Harrison & Abramovitz filed plans for the building in March 1957. A groundbreaking ceremony occurred on May 16, 1957, marking the start of excavation. By the following month, the building was 70 percent leased, and Curtiss-Wright and Westinghouse Electric Corporation had become tenants. The Rockefeller Center Sidewalk Superintendents' Club, composed of members of the public who wanted to observe Rockefeller Center's construction, was revived after having been dormant for seventeen years. The actress Marilyn Monroe presided over the club's inaugural ceremonies that July.

By November 1957, the excavations were largely complete; the Rockefeller Foundation had leased offices and two tenants had expanded their lease commitments. Rockefeller Center Inc. chairman Nelson Rockefeller and Time Inc. president Roy E. Larsen announced details of the design the same month. Construction on the Time-Life Building's superstructure started in April 1958. That August, the Equitable Life Assurance Society loaned the project's developers $50 million. At the time, it was the largest-ever financing on a single real-estate parcel. The structure topped out in November of that year. The next April, Time Inc. sublet six of the 21 floors under its control. The building was 92 percent leased by then, including the space that was being sublet. The Time-Life Building's cornerstone was laid in June 1959, at the southeast corner of the building, after the superstructure had been completed.

Late 20th century 

The first tenant, the American Cyanamid Company, began moving into the tower in October 1959. Over the next couple of months, tenants began moving into the building and the final interior design elements were installed. By that December, the construction fence around 1271 Avenue of the Americas had been dismantled and several companies had occupied their space. Additional leases were announced in January 1960, including one storefront. A passageway from the basement to the subway station opened the next month. Life magazine moved into the building that April, writing that its new headquarters was "a victory in the fight to improve down-at-the-heels Sixth Avenue". Ultimately, Time Inc. was able to sublet part of its space to more than forty firms. By late 1961, the building was almost completely occupied.

La Fonda del Sol had moved out of the Time & Life Building to a smaller location by early 1971. The restaurant space was replaced by a Seaman's Trust bank branch. The bank was so popular that, in three weeks, it performed six months' worth of transactions. Although Life magazine shuttered in 1972, the building retained its name and the former Life space was quickly taken by the company's other publications, such as People and Money. A U.S. Steakhouse restaurant designed by Gwathmey Siegel & Associates Architects opened in the building in 1975 and was slightly renovated a few years later. The eighth-floor auditorium was renovated in 1983. An electric cooling system was also added in the early 1980s to supplement the original steam-powered cooling system.

Time Inc. sold its 45 percent ownership stake in December 1986 to the Rockefeller Group, which by then was the majority owner, for $118 million. Time Inc. planned to use some of the proceeds from the sale for other purchases such as stock buybacks. In the same transaction, Time Inc. extended its lease from 1997 to 2007, with an option to extend its lease by another ten years, to 2017. Time Inc. executed its option to extend its lease in 1999. At the time, the company occupied 80 percent of the Time & Life Building and it had rented space at the adjacent 135 West 50th Street. The two buildings were to be connected internally on the second floor as part of a $190 million renovation. A natural-gas cooling system was added in 2000; at the time, it was New York City's only building with three cooling sources.

21st century 

By August 2001, Time Inc. was part of AOL Time Warner and occupied 98 percent of the building's space. That month, AOL Time Warner subsidiary CNN and the Rockefeller Group agreed to convert a former Chase Manhattan Bank branch at the base into a two-story CNN television studio. In July 2002, the New York City Landmarks Preservation Commission designated the lobby interior as a city landmark. Municipal Art Society executive director Frank E. Sanchis III prompted Rockefeller Center's owner at the time, the Rockefeller Group, to support the preservation of the lobby. At the time, the lobby was being renovated by Swanke Hayden Connell Architects for $40 million. The renovation involved combining two storefronts into a waiting lounge, as well as creating a secure area around the elevators. The CNN studio opened in September 2002, with scenic design by Production Design Group. The Ted's Montana Grill restaurant opened in 2006 on the ground level.

In May 2014, Time Inc. announced it was planning to leave the Time & Life Building for the Brookfield Place complex in lower Manhattan. The following year, Time Inc. moved out of its offices, and the Rockefeller Group announced a $325 million renovation for the entire building, designed by Pei Cobb Freed & Partners. As part of the renovation, the architects created a new entrance on Sixth Avenue, repaved the plaza, and replaced the facade. The Rockefeller Group also restored the lobby and renamed the building to its address. Time Inc. removed a time capsule that had been embedded in the building since its cornerstone was laid. In addition, Glarner's and Albers's paintings were restored, and the floors, ceilings, and signs were modified to match the original design. The building was completely vacant by the beginning of 2018.

The renovation was nearly completed by 2019 and was fully leased at that time. However, with the COVID-19 pandemic in New York City the following year, the building stood largely empty for months. Following the completion of the renovation, the building received a Leadership in Energy and Environmental Design (LEED) Gold certification in 2020. Despite the COVID-19 pandemic, the building was again fully leased by May 2021. The Greek restaurant Avra Estiatorio leased a two-story space at the base, which opened in June 2022.

Tenants 
 American International Group
 Bessemer Trust
 Blank Rome
 Greenhill & Co.
 H.I.G. Capital
 Latham & Watkins
 Major League Baseball including a two-level MLB Store at the building's base
 Mizuho Financial Group

Impact
Upon the building's completion, Architectural Forum wrote: "The building's character reflects a joining of partners, a marriage of uses, a meld of design, and a union between New York's two generic office-building types. [...] In skyscraper society, the Time & Life Building is upper-middle-class." New York Times critic Ada Louise Huxtable, writing in 1960, said that 1271 Avenue of the Americas, 28 Liberty Street, and 270 Park Avenue all had a "still too-rare esthetic excellence". Huxtable also characterized 1271 Avenue of the Americas' spaces as "flexible architectural anarchy". In a 2022 appraisal of public art in New York City buildings, Anthony Paletta of The Daily Beast described the building's lobby as having "Burle-Marx-like" flooring, while Albers's Portals and Glarner's Relational Painting No. 88 were "two great pieces" of art. 1271 Avenue of the Americas' completion spurred the construction of other buildings along Sixth Avenue.

1271 Avenue of the Americas has also been shown in works of popular culture. The building was prominent in the television series Mad Men as the fictional headquarters of the advertising agency Sterling Cooper Draper Pryce (later Sterling Cooper & Partners). AMC, the network on which Mad Men airs, unveiled a bench in front of the building in 2015; it contains a sculpture of lead character Don Draper's black silhouette, as shown in the show's opening credits. In addition, the 2013 film The Secret Life of Walter Mitty was partially set within the building.

References

Notes

Citations

Sources

External links

 

1959 establishments in New York City
Leadership in Energy and Environmental Design basic silver certified buildings
Magazine headquarters
Mass media company headquarters in the United States
Modernist architecture in New York City
New York City Designated Landmarks in Manhattan
New York City interior landmarks
Office buildings completed in 1959
Rockefeller Center
Sixth Avenue
Skyscraper office buildings in Manhattan